Panogaon is a town and a Panchayat in Dewas district in the Indian state of Madhya Pradesh. PanoGaon is a major agricultural production area in Madhya Pradesh. Earlier. India census,

References 

Cities and towns in Dewas district